Indiya Toku (born 29 September 1994) is an Indian cricketer. He made his first-class debut for Arunachal Pradesh in the 2018–19 Ranji Trophy on 6 December 2018. He made his List A debut on 25 February 2021, for Arunachal Pradesh in the 2020–21 Vijay Hazare Trophy. He made his Twenty20 debut on 9 November 2021, for Arunachal Pradesh in the 2021–22 Syed Mushtaq Ali Trophy.

References

External links
 

1994 births
Living people
Indian cricketers
Place of birth missing (living people)
Arunachal Pradesh cricketers